Teen Ink is a monthly tabloid-format magazine which is marketed to, and written by, teenagers. It is based in Atlanta, Georgia, and published by the Young Authors Foundation, a non-profit organization. The magazine's name was originally The 21st Century. The current publisher of Teen Ink is David J. Kim

Books 
Teen Ink also prints a series of anthologies with selected writing from the magazine; they are co-published by HCI, publishers of the Chicken Soup series, and the Young Authors Foundation.

The anthologies which have been published so far include:

Teen Ink: Our Voices, Our Visions, 2000; 
Teen Ink 2: More Voices, More Visions, 2001; 
Teen Ink: Friends and Family, 2001; 
Teen Ink: Love and Relationships, 2002; 
Teen Ink: What Matters, 2003; 
Teen Ink: Written in the Dirt, 2004; 
Chicken Soup for the Teen Soul, 2007, 

Teen Ink also publishes a magazine with the best work, written or art, from its creators. Anyone between the ages of 13 and 19 can sign up and publish their work, which, if it is appropriate, will be published to their website. some of it receives editors pick, and the best is published in the magazine.

Teen Ink is the largest site for teen creators. In October 2020, it changed ownership.

Poetry Journal 
Poetry is a major focus of this magazine and is published in each monthly issue.

References
 Kurland, Ann. "Magazine gives teens with views a place to express them", The Boston Globe, October 11, 2004.
 Halls, Kelly. "Teen Ink offers creative outlet for youth", The Denver Post, April 8, 2001.

External links
 TeenInk.com

1989 establishments in Massachusetts
Monthly magazines published in the United States
Poetry magazines published in the United States
Magazines established in 1989
Magazines published in Atlanta
Teen magazines